The 2009 Hockey East Men's Ice Hockey Tournament was played between March 13 and March 21, 2009 at campus locations and at the TD Banknorth Garden in Boston, Massachusetts, United States. Boston University won their seventh Hockey East Men's Ice Hockey Tournament and the Lamoriello Trophy and received Hockey East's automatic bid to the 2009 NCAA Division I Men's Ice Hockey Tournament.

Format
The tournament featured three rounds of play. The teams that finish below eighth in the conference are not eligible for tournament play. In the first round, the first and eighth seeds, the second and seventh seeds, the third seed and sixth seeds, and the fourth seed and fifth seeds played a best-of-three with the winner advancing to the semifinals. In the semifinals, the highest and lowest seeds and second-highest and second-lowest seeds play a single-elimination game, with the winner advancing to the championship game. The tournament champion receives an automatic bid to the 2009 NCAA Division I Men's Ice Hockey Tournament.

Regular season standings
Note: GP = Games played; W = Wins; L = Losses; T = Ties; PTS = Points; GF = Goals For; GA = Goals Against

Bracket

Note: * denotes overtime period(s)

Quarterfinals

(1) Boston University vs. (8) Maine

(2) Northeastern vs. (7) Massachusetts

(3) New Hampshire vs. (6) Boston College

(4) Vermont vs. (5) Massachusetts-Lowell

Semifinals

(1) Boston University vs. (6) Boston College

(2) Northeastern vs. (5) Massachusetts-Lowell

Championship

(1) Boston University vs. (5) Massachusetts-Lowell

Tournament awards

All-Tournament Team
F Scott Campbell (Massachusetts-Lowell)
F John McCarthy (Boston University)
F Colin Wilson (Boston University)
D Maury Edwards (Massachusetts-Lowell)
D Matt Gilroy (Boston University)
G Kieran Millan* (Boston University)
* Tournament MVP(s)

References

External links
2009 Hockey East Men's Ice Hockey Tournament

Hockey East Men's Ice Hockey Tournament
Hockey East